In statistics, the kth order statistic of a statistical sample is equal to its kth-smallest value. Together with rank statistics, order statistics are among the most fundamental tools in non-parametric statistics and inference.

Important special cases of the order statistics are the minimum and maximum value of a sample, and (with some qualifications discussed below) the sample median and other sample quantiles.

When using probability theory to analyze order statistics of random samples from a continuous distribution, the cumulative distribution function is used to reduce the analysis to the case of order statistics of the uniform distribution.

Notation and examples 

For example, suppose that four numbers are observed or recorded, resulting in a sample of size 4. If the sample values are

6, 9, 3, 8,

the order statistics would be denoted

where the subscript  enclosed in parentheses indicates the th order statistic of the sample.

The first order statistic (or smallest order statistic) is always the minimum of the sample, that is,

where, following a common convention, we use upper-case letters to refer to random variables, and lower-case letters (as above) to refer to their actual observed values.

Similarly, for a sample of size , the th order statistic (or largest order statistic) is the maximum, that is,

The sample range is the difference between the maximum and minimum.  It is a function of the order statistics:

A similar important statistic in exploratory data analysis that is simply related to the order statistics is the sample interquartile range.

The sample median may or may not be an order statistic, since there is a single middle value only when the number  of observations is odd. Similar remarks apply to all sample quantiles.

Probabilistic analysis 

Given any random variables X1, X2..., Xn, the order statistics X(1), X(2), ..., X(n) are also random variables, defined by sorting the values (realizations) of X1, ..., Xn in increasing order.

When the random variables X1, X2..., Xn form a sample they are independent and identically distributed. This is the case treated below. In general, the random variables X1, ..., Xn can arise by sampling from more than one population. Then they are independent, but not necessarily identically distributed, and their joint probability distribution is given by the Bapat–Beg theorem.

From now on, we will assume that the random variables under consideration are continuous and, where convenient, we will also assume that they have a probability density function (PDF), that is, they are absolutely continuous. The peculiarities of the analysis of distributions assigning mass to points (in particular, discrete distributions) are discussed at the end.

Cumulative distribution function of order statistics 

For a random sample as above, with cumulative distribution , the order statistics for that sample have cumulative distributions as follows
(where r specifies which order statistic):

the corresponding probability density function may be derived from this result, and is found to be

Moreover, there are two special cases, which have CDFs that are easy to compute.

Which can be derived by careful consideration of probabilities.

Probability distributions of order statistics

Order statistics sampled from a uniform distribution 

In this section we show that the order statistics of the uniform distribution on the unit interval have marginal distributions belonging to the beta distribution family. We also give a simple method to derive the joint distribution of any number of order statistics, and finally translate these results to arbitrary continuous distributions using the cdf.

We assume throughout this section that  is a random sample drawn from a continuous distribution with cdf . Denoting  we obtain the corresponding random sample  from the standard uniform distribution. Note that the order statistics also satisfy .

The probability density function of the order statistic  is equal to

that is, the kth order statistic of the uniform distribution is a beta-distributed random variable.

The proof of these statements is as follows. For  to be between u and u + du, it is necessary that exactly k − 1 elements of the sample are smaller than u, and that at least one is between u and u + du. The probability that more than one is in this latter interval is already , so we have to calculate the probability that exactly k − 1, 1 and n − k observations fall in the intervals ,  and  respectively. This equals (refer to multinomial distribution for details)

and the result follows.

The mean of this distribution is k / (n + 1).

The joint distribution of the order statistics of the uniform distribution 

Similarly, for i < j, the joint probability density function of the two order statistics U(i) < U(j) can be shown to be

One reasons in an entirely analogous way to derive the higher-order joint distributions. Perhaps surprisingly, the joint density of the n order statistics turns out to be constant:

One way to understand this is that the unordered sample does have constant density equal to 1, and that there are n! different permutations of the sample corresponding to the same sequence of order statistics. This is related to the fact that 1/n! is the volume of the region . It is also related with another particularity of  order statistics of uniform random variables: It follows from the BRS-inequality that the maximum expected number of uniform U(0,1] random variables one can choose from a sample of size n with a sum up not exceeding  is bounded above by
, which is thus invariant on the set of all 
with constant product .

Order statistics sampled from an exponential distribution 

For  a random sample of size n from an exponential distribution with parameter λ, the order statistics X(i) for i = 1,2,3, ..., n each have distribution

where the Zj are iid standard exponential random variables (i.e. with rate parameter 1). This result was first published by Alfréd Rényi.

Order statistics sampled from an Erlang distribution 

The Laplace transform of order statistics may be sampled from an Erlang distribution via a path counting method .

The joint distribution of the order statistics of an absolutely continuous distribution 

If FX is absolutely continuous, it has a density such that , and we can use the substitutions

and

to derive the following probability density functions for the order statistics of a sample of size n drawn from the distribution of X:

 where 

 where

Application: confidence intervals for quantiles 

An interesting question is how well the order statistics perform as estimators of the quantiles of the underlying distribution.

A small-sample-size example 

The simplest case to consider is how well the sample median estimates the population median.

As an example, consider a random sample of size 6. In that case, the sample median is usually defined as the midpoint of the interval delimited by the 3rd and 4th order statistics. However, we know from the preceding discussion that the probability that this interval actually contains the population median is 

Although the sample median is probably among the best distribution-independent point estimates of the population median, what this example illustrates is that it is not a particularly good one in absolute terms. In this particular case, a better confidence interval for the median is the one delimited by the 2nd and 5th order statistics, which contains the population median with probability

With such a small sample size, if one wants at least 95% confidence, one is reduced to saying that the median is between the minimum and the maximum of the 6 observations with probability 31/32 or approximately 97%. Size 6 is, in fact, the smallest sample size such that the interval determined by the minimum and the maximum is at least a 95% confidence interval for the population median.

Large sample sizes 

For the uniform distribution, as n tends to infinity, the pth sample quantile is asymptotically normally distributed, since it is approximated by

 

For a general distribution F with a continuous non-zero density at F −1(p), a similar asymptotic normality applies:

 

where f is the density function, and F −1 is the quantile function associated with F. One of the first people to mention and prove this result was Frederick Mosteller in his seminal paper in 1946. Further research led in the 1960s to the Bahadur representation which provides information about the errorbounds.

An interesting observation can be made in the case where the distribution is symmetric, and the population median equals the population mean. In this case, the sample mean, by the central limit theorem, is also asymptotically normally distributed, but with variance σ2/n instead. This asymptotic analysis suggests that the mean outperforms the median in cases of low kurtosis, and vice versa. For example, the median achieves better confidence intervals for the Laplace distribution, while the mean performs better for X that are normally distributed.

Proof 
It can be shown that

 

where

 

with Zi being independent identically distributed exponential random variables with rate 1. Since X/n and Y/n are asymptotically normally distributed by the CLT, our results follow by application of the delta method.

Application: Non-parametric density estimation 

Moments of the distribution for the first order statistic can be used to develop a non-parametric density estimator. Suppose, we want to estimate the density  at the point . Consider the random variables , which are i.i.d with distribution function . In particular, .

The expected value of the first order statistic  given a sample of  total observations yields,

 

This equation in combination with a jackknifing technique becomes the basis for the following density estimation algorithm,

   Input: A sample of  observations.  points of density evaluation. Tuning parameter  (usually 1/3).
   Output:  estimated density at the points of evaluation.

   1: Set 
   2: Set 
   3: Create an  matrix  which holds  subsets with  observations each.
   4: Create a vector  to hold the density evaluations.
   5: for  do
   6:     for  do
   7:         Find the nearest distance  to the current point  within the th subset
   8:      end for
   9:      Compute the subset average of distances to 
  10:      Compute the density estimate at 
  11:  end for
  12: return 

In contrast to the bandwidth/length based tuning parameters for histogram and kernel based approaches, the tuning parameter for the order statistic based density estimator is the size of sample subsets. Such an estimator is more robust than histogram and kernel based approaches, for example densities like the Cauchy distribution (which lack finite moments) can be inferred without the need for specialized modifications such as IQR based bandwidths. This is because the first moment of the order statistic always exists if the expected value of the underlying distribution does, but the converse is not necessarily true.

Dealing with discrete variables 
Suppose  are i.i.d. random variables from a discrete distribution with cumulative distribution function  and probability mass function . To find the probabilities of the  order statistics, three values are first needed, namely

The cumulative distribution function of the  order statistic can be computed by noting that

Similarly,  is given by

Computing order statistics 

The problem of computing the kth smallest (or largest) element of a list is called the selection problem and is solved by a selection algorithm. Although this problem is difficult for very large lists, sophisticated selection algorithms have been created that can solve this problem in time proportional to the number of elements in the list, even if the list is totally unordered. If the data is stored in certain specialized data structures, this time can be brought down to O(log n). In many applications all order statistics are required, in which case a sorting algorithm can be used and the time taken is  O(n log n).

See also 
 Rankit
 Box plot
 BRS-inequality
 Concomitant (statistics)
 Fisher–Tippett distribution
 Bapat–Beg theorem for the order statistics of independent but not necessarily identically distributed random variables
 Bernstein polynomial
 L-estimator – linear combinations of order statistics
 Rank-size distribution
 Selection algorithm

Examples of order statistics 
 Sample maximum and minimum
 Quantile
 Percentile
 Decile
 Quartile
 Median

References

External links 
  Retrieved Feb 02,2005
  Retrieved Feb 02,2005
 C++ source Dynamic Order Statistics

Nonparametric statistics
Summary statistics
Permutations